CBC may refer to:

Media
 Cadena Baja California or Grupo Cadena, a radio and television broadcaster in Mexico
 Canadian Broadcasting Corporation
 Canadian Broadcasting Centre
 CBC.ca, the English-language online service of the Canadian Broadcasting Corporation
 Capital Broadcasting Center, an Egyptian television broadcasting channel
 Caribbean Broadcasting Corporation, a national radio and TV broadcaster operated by the state-owned broadcasting corporation of Barbados
 CBC-TV8, the oldest broadcast station in Barbados
 CBC Benna, an Algerian television channel
 Chubu-Nippon Broadcasting, a radio station and a TV station in Nagoya, Japan
Comments by Celebs, a popular Instagram account and podcast highlighting celebrities’ use of social media
 Capitol Broadcasting Company

Organizations
 Carolina Bird Club, a non-profit organisation
 Commercial Bank of Ceylon, a private bank in Sri Lanka
 Commercial Banking Company of Sydney, a former bank in Australia
 Commonwealth Business Council, an association promoting Commonwealth trade
 , a Brazilian ammunition manufacturer
 Congressional Black Caucus, an organization of African American members of the Congress of the US
 Copyright Board of Canada

Education
 Central Bible College, a college in Springfield, Missouri, US
 Coastal Bend College, a community college in southern Texas, US
 Columbia Basin College, a community college in Pasco, Washington, US
 Columbia Bible College, a college in Abbotsford, British Columbia, Canada
 Covenant Bible College, a closed college in the Covenant, Canada

Science and technology
 Cannabichromene, a non-psychoactive cannabinoid found in cannabis
 Cap binding complex, a protein complex
 Cipher block chaining
 Common Booster Core, part of a Delta IV rocket
 Complete blood count, a blood test panel
 Cornering brake control, a car safety system
 Customer Bar Code, barcode symbology for UK postcodes and Delivery Point Suffixes
 CBC controller, a controller used by Botball
 Clustering By Committee, a clustering algorithm for word-sense induction
 COIN-OR branch and cut, a linear programming optimization solver in the COIN-OR project

Other uses
 CBC band, a rock band based in the former South Vietnam
 Caius Boat Club, a boat club for members of Gonville and Caius College, Cambridge, England
 Chalmers Ballong Corps, a ballooning club in Sweden
 's reporting mark
 Christmas Bird Count, an annual bird census
 , the governing body for cycling in Brazil
 Congressional Bike Caucus, an organization of US congressmen promoting cycling
 Cross-border cooperation, one of the forms of territorial cooperation in the European Union

See also
 Calvary Baptist Church (disambiguation)
 CBBC (disambiguation)
 Central Baptist Church (disambiguation), Baptist churches in various places
 Children's Book Council (disambiguation)
 Christian Brothers College (disambiguation)